On the Road to Emmaus is a 2001 Finnish musical film written and directed by Markku Pölönen. During his stay, as he's walking down the main road, he is forced to confront his past and realizes how selfish his life has been.

Sanna-Kaisa Palo won the 2002 Jussi Award for Best Supporting Actress while the film was nominated for an additional six Jussis including Best Film, Best Direction, Best Script, and Best Supporting Actor for Peter Franzén.

Cast and characters
 Puntti Valtonen – Rane
 Peter Franzén – Mankka-Arvi
 Lotta Lehtikari – Rebekka
 Katariina Kaitue – Maikki
 Tommi Korpela – Kuoppala
 Sanna-Kaisa Palo – Ella

See also
 2001 in film
 Cinema of Finland
 List of Finnish films: 2000s

References

External links
 

Finnish musical films
2001 films
Films directed by Markku Pölönen